Sainte-Monique is a municipality in the Centre-du-Québec region of the province of Quebec in Canada. The population as of the Canada 2011 Census was 548.

Demographics

Population
Population trend:

(+) Amalgamation of the Parish and the Village of Sainte-Monique on January 3, 1996.

Language
Mother tongue language (2006)

See also
List of municipalities in Quebec
Municipal history of Quebec

References

External links

Designated places in Quebec
Municipalities in Quebec
Incorporated places in Centre-du-Québec
Nicolet-Yamaska Regional County Municipality